Abarca is a Spanish surname. Notable people with the surname include:

Agustín Abarca (1882–1953), Chilean painter
Alisson Abarca (born 1996), Salvadoran model
Apolonia Muñoz Abarca (1920–2009), American health professional
Carlos Abarca (1900–?), Chilean Olympic boxer
Cristián Abarca (born 1989), Chilean footballer
Damaris Abarca (born 1990), Chilean lawyer
Joaquín Abarca (1780–1844), Spanish prelate
Josep María Abarca (born 1974), Spanish water polo player
Josué Abarca (born 2000), Costa Rican footballer
Juan Abarca (born 1988), Chilean footballer
Luis Abarca (born 1965), Chilean footballer
Luis Flores Abarca (born 1982), Chilean footballer
Maria de Abarca (died 1656), Spanish painter
Mariano Abarca (1958–2009), Mexican community activist
Mariano Ricafort Palacín y Abarca (1776–1846), Governor of Cuba from 1832–1834
Obdulia Torres Abarca (born 1961), Mexican Democratic Revolution party politician
Pedro Abarca (1619–1693), Spanish Jesuit theologian
Pedro Pablo Abarca de Bolea, Count of Aranda (1718–1798), Spanish statesman and diplomat
Ricardo Abarca (born 1986), Mexican actor and singer
Ximena Abarca (born 1981), Chilean pop singer

See also 
Abarca (disambiguation)

Spanish-language surnames